Harry Rosenswärd (20 April 1882 – 16 July 1955) was a Swedish sailor who competed in the 1912 Summer Olympics. He was a crew member of the Swedish boat Kitty, which won the gold medal in the 10 metre class.

References

Sources

External links 
 
 

1882 births
1955 deaths
Swedish male sailors (sport)
Olympic sailors of Sweden
Olympic gold medalists for Sweden
Olympic medalists in sailing
Medalists at the 1912 Summer Olympics
Sailors at the 1912 Summer Olympics – 10 Metre